Toppenish School District No. 202 is a public school district in Toppenish, Washington, United States.  It serves the city of Toppenish, the surrounding areas in Yakima County, and members of the nearby Yakima Nation.

In May 2017, the district had an enrollment of 4,617 students.

Schools

Early learning schools 
 Toppenish Preschool Cooperative

Elementary schools 
 Garfield Elementary
 Lincoln Elementary
 Kirkwood  Elementary
 Valley View Elementary

Middle schools 
 Toppenish Middle School

High schools 
 Toppenish High School
 E.A.G.L.E. High School

Alternative programs 
 CATS (Computer Academy of Toppenish Schools), an on-line learning program supported by certified teachers.

Community partners
The district has partnerships with various organizations in the community and further afield.  These include:
ESD 105
Bill and Melinda Gates Foundation
Heritage University
Northwest Community Action Center
University of Washington / Gear-Up
Washington State University
Yakama Indian Nation
Yakima Valley Community College
Yakima Valley Farm Workers Clinic

Governance
The district is governed by a board of directors elected from geographical sub-districts. Each of the five directors is elected for a term of four years.

The superintendent is John Cerna.

References

External links
 
OSPI school district report card 2012-2013

School districts in Washington (state)
Education in Yakima County, Washington
School districts established in 1944
1944 establishments in Washington (state)